Callam Mendez-Jones (born 31 January 1996) is an English footballer who plays for  side Hednesford Town, where he plays as a defender.

Playing career

Accrington Stanley
In June 2016 he joined Accrington Stanley on a 6-month loan. He was named on the bench on the opening game of the season against Doncaster Rovers, making his debut in the same game coming off the bench for Janoi Donacien in the 79th minute.

Mendez-Jones was released from the club on 30 June 2017.

Hednesford Town
Mendez-Jones signed for Hednesford Town in November 2017.

Rushall Olympic
During pre-season of the 2019–20 season, Callam signed for Rushall Olympic, but it was only in September 2019 that he was able to make his debut, due to an MCL injury.

Redditch United
Mendez-Jones signed for Redditch United on 21 November 2019.

Career statistics

References

External links
 

1996 births
Living people
People from Sandwell (district)
Accrington Stanley F.C. players
West Bromwich Albion F.C. players
English Football League players
Association football defenders
Hednesford Town F.C. players
Halesowen Town F.C. players
Rushall Olympic F.C. players
Redditch United F.C. players
Buxton F.C. players
English footballers